The 2013 USASA Region II National Cup is a qualifying tournament that will determine which clubs from the second region of the United States Adult Soccer Association qualified for the first round proper of the 2013 U.S. Open Cup. The Region II National Cup's first round matches took place on 6 April 2012 with the 2nd round match taking place on 20 April 2012.

Qualification

Bracket 

°The Dearborn Stars advanced after a successful protest about the size of the field in Kansas. KC Athletics originally won the match 1–0. KC Athletics withdrew from the competition when a reply of the match was ordered to happen in Chicago.

See also 
 2013 U.S. Open Cup
 2013 U.S. Open Cup qualification
 United States Adult Soccer Association

References

External links 

2013 U.S. Open Cup
2013
2012